A globe is a spherical model of Earth, of some other celestial body, or of the celestial sphere. Globes serve purposes similar to maps, but unlike maps, they do not distort the surface that they portray except to scale it down. A model globe of Earth is called a terrestrial globe. A model globe of the celestial sphere is called a celestial globe.

A globe shows details of its subject. A terrestrial globe shows landmasses and water bodies. It might show nations and major cities and the network of latitude and longitude lines. Some have raised relief to show mountains and other large landforms. A celestial globe shows notable stars, and may also show positions of other prominent astronomical objects. Typically, it will also divide the celestial sphere into constellations.

The word globe comes from the Latin word globus, meaning "sphere". Globes have a long history. The first known mention of a globe is from Strabo, describing the Globe of Crates from about 150 BC. The oldest surviving terrestrial globe is the Erdapfel, made by Martin Behaim in 1492. The oldest surviving celestial globe sits atop the Farnese Atlas, carved in the 2nd century Roman Empire.

Terrestrial and planetary
 Flat maps are created using a map projection that inevitably introduces an increasing amount of distortion the larger the area that the map shows. A globe is the only representation of the Earth that does not distort either the shape or the size of large features – land masses, bodies of water, etc.

The Earth's circumference is quite close to 40 million metres. Many globes are made with a circumference of one metre, so they are models of the Earth at a scale of 1:40 million. In imperial units, many globes are made with a diameter of one foot (about 30 cm), yielding a circumference of 3.14 feet (about 96 cm) and a scale of 1:42 million. Globes are also made in many other sizes.

Some globes have surface texture showing topography or bathymetry. In these, elevations and depressions are purposely exaggerated, as they otherwise would be hardly visible.

Most modern globes are also imprinted with parallels and meridians, so that one can tell the approximate coordinates of a specific location. Globes may also show the boundaries of countries and their names.

Many terrestrial globes have one celestial feature marked on them: a diagram called the analemma, which shows the apparent motion of the Sun in the sky during a year.

Globes generally show north at the top, but many globes allow the axis to be swiveled so that southern portions can be viewed conveniently. This capability also permits exploring the Earth from different orientations to help counter the north-up bias caused by conventional map presentation.

Celestial

Celestial globes show the apparent positions of the stars in the sky. They omit the Sun, Moon and planets because the positions of these bodies vary relative to those of the stars, but the ecliptic, along which the Sun moves, is indicated. In their most basic form celestial globes represent the stars as if the viewer were looking down upon the sky as a globe that surrounds the earth.

History
The sphericity of the Earth was established  by Greek astronomy in the 3rd century BC, and the earliest terrestrial globe appeared from that period. The earliest known example is the one constructed by Crates of Mallus in Cilicia (now Çukurova in modern-day Turkey), in the mid-2nd century BC.

No terrestrial globes from Antiquity have survived. An example of a surviving celestial globe is part of a Hellenistic sculpture, called the Farnese Atlas, surviving in a 2nd-century AD Roman copy in the Naples Archaeological Museum, Italy.

Early terrestrial globes depicting the entirety of the Old World were constructed in the Islamic world. During the Middle Ages in Christian Europe, while there are writings alluding to the idea that the earth was spherical, no known attempts at making a globe took place before the fifteenth century. The earliest extant terrestrial globe was made in 1492 by Martin Behaim (1459–1537) with help from the painter Georg Glockendon. Behaim was a German mapmaker, navigator, and merchant. Working in Nuremberg, Germany, he called his globe the "Nürnberg Terrestrial Globe." It is now known as the Erdapfel. Before constructing the globe, Behaim had traveled extensively. He sojourned in Lisbon from 1480, developing commercial interests and mingling with explorers and scientists. He began to construct his globe after his return to Nürnberg in 1490.

China made many mapping advancements such as sophisticated land surveys and the invention of the magnetic compass. However, no record of terrestrial globes in China exists until a globe was introduced by the Persian astronomer, Jamal ad-Din, in 1276.

Another early globe, the Hunt–Lenox Globe, ca. 1510, is thought to be the source of the phrase Hic Sunt Dracones, or “Here be dragons”. A similar grapefruit-sized globe made from two halves of an ostrich egg was found in 2012 and is believed to date from 1504. It may be the oldest globe to show the New World. Stefaan Missine, who analyzed the globe for the Washington Map Society journal Portolan, said it was “part of an important European collection for decades.” After a year of research in which he consulted many experts, Missine concluded the Hunt–Lenox Globe was a copper cast of the egg globe.

A facsimile globe showing America was made by Martin Waldseemüller in 1507. Another "remarkably modern-looking" terrestrial globe of the Earth was constructed by Taqi al-Din at the Constantinople observatory of Taqi ad-Din during the 1570s.

The world's first seamless celestial globe was built by Mughal scientists under the patronage of Jahangir.

Globus IMP, electro-mechanical devices including five-inch globes have been used in Soviet and Russian spacecraft from 1961 to 2002 as navigation instruments. In 2001, the TMA version of the Soyuz spacecraft replaced this instrument with a digital map.

Manufacture

Traditionally, globes were manufactured by gluing a printed paper map onto a sphere, often made from wood.

The most common type has long, thin gores (strips) of paper that narrow to a point at the poles,  small disks cover over the inevitable irregularities at these points. The more gores there are, the less stretching and crumpling is required to make the paper map fit the sphere. This method of globe making was illustrated in 1802 in an engraving in The English Encyclopedia by George Kearsley. 

Modern globes are often made from thermoplastic. Flat, plastic disks are printed with a distorted map of one of the Earth's hemispheres. This is placed in a machine which molds the disk into a hemispherical shape. The hemisphere is united with its opposite counterpart to form a complete globe.

Usually a globe is mounted so that its rotation axis is 23.5° (0.41 rad) from vertical, which is the angle the Earth's rotation axis deviates from perpendicular to the plane of its orbit. This mounting makes it easy to visualize how seasons change.

In the 1800s small pocket globes (less than 3 inches) were status symbols for gentlemen and educational toys for rich children.

Examples

Sorted in decreasing sizes:

This corresponds to a scale of about 1:350 000. (There are larger spherical structures, such as the Cinesphere in Toronto, Ontario, Canada, but this does not have geographical or astronomical markings.)
This corresponds to a scale of about 1:1.1 million. Eartha was constructed in 1998.
 The Mapparium, three-story, stained glass globe at the Mary Baker Eddy Library in Boston, which visitors walk through its diameter via a  glass bridge. This corresponds to a scale of about 1:1.4 million.
 The Babson globe in Wellesley, Massachusetts, a  diameter globe which originally rotated on its axis and on its base to simulate day and night and the seasons. This corresponds to a scale of about 1:1.6 million.
 The giant  diameter globe in the lobby of The News Building in New York City, corresponding to a scale of about 1:3.5 million.

Images

See also

Analemma
Armillary sphere
Cartography
Dymaxion map
Earth in culture
Ellen Eliza Fitz
Emery Molyneux
Globus Jagellonicus
Hunt–Lenox Globe
Johannes Schöner globe
Orrery
Planetarium
Science On a Sphere
Virtual globe
Voskhod Spacecraft "Globus" IMP navigation instrument
Ibrahim ibn Said al-Sahli

References

External links

ppmglobe – generate strips to glue onto a sphere
Behind the scenes at London's globe-making workshop – a photo essay (August 2017), The Guardian

Map types
Spheres
Articles containing video clips
Science education materials